Kahriz Beyk (also Romanized as Kahrīz Beyk; also known as Kahrīz) is a village in Qaleh Juq Rural District, Anguran District, Mahneshan County, Zanjan Province, Iran. At the 2017 census, its population was 345, in 102 families.

References 

Populated places in Mahneshan County